Michael Jay Woods (November 1, 1954 – May 29, 2009) was an American football linebacker who played three seasons with the Baltimore Colts of the National Football League. He was drafted by the Baltimore Colts in the second round of the 1978 NFL Draft. Woods first enrolled at Ellsworth Community College before transferring to the University of Tampa and lastly the University of Cincinnati. He attended Benedictine High School in Cleveland, Ohio.

Early years
Woods participated in football, basketball and track and field for the Benedictine High School Bengals.

College career
Woods first played college football at Ellsworth Community College. He then transferred to the University of Tampa. In 1975, he transferred to the University of Cincinnati after Tampa Spartans football was discontinued at the end of the 1974 season. He played for the Cincinnati Bearcats from 1975 to 1977. He was a first-team All-American in 1977 and the first graduate of the University of Cincinnati to earn All-American honors. Woods recorded 114 tackles as a senior.  He was also selected to play in the Senior Bowl. He was inducted into the inaugural Bearcats Ring of Honor in 2006.

Professional career

Baltimore Colts
Woods was drafted by the Baltimore Colts with the 52nd pick in the 1978 NFL Draft. He played in 36 games for the Colts from 1979 to 1981, starting 19.

Shooting
On May 21, 1982, Woods went to a house in Cleveland to retrieve his father from all-night poker game. At the house he was shot in the neck in a robbery attempt. The injury paralyzed Woods, rendering him a quadriplegic. 17-year-old Victor Gomez Jr. was arrested within a week. Woods died on May 29, 2009.

References

External links
Just Sports Stats

1954 births
2009 deaths
Players of American football from Cleveland
American football linebackers
African-American players of American football
Ellsworth Panthers football players
Tampa Spartans football players
Cincinnati Bearcats football players
Baltimore Colts players
All-American college football players
People with tetraplegia
20th-century African-American sportspeople
21st-century African-American people
Ed Block Courage Award recipients